The 2009 European U17 Badminton Championships were held in Medvode, Slovenia, between November 11 and November 15, 2009.

Medalists

External links
TournamentSoftware.com: European U17 Championships 2009

U17 2009
European U17 Badminton Championships
Badminton tournaments in Slovenia